is a junction passenger railway station located in Chūō-ku, Chiba, Chiba Prefecture, Japan, operated by the East Japan Railway Company (JR East).

Lines
It is also served by trains of the Uchibō Line which continue past the nominal terminus of that line at Soga Station to terminate at Chiba as well.

Station layout
Hon-Chiba station consists of a single island platform serving two tracks. The station is elevated, with the station building below. The station is attended. The east side of the station is much busier than the west side.

Platforms

History
It was renamed to its present name on 28 January 1902. On 1 September 1907, the Bōsō Railway was nationalized and became part of the Japanese Government Railways, which was transformed into the Japan National Railways (JNR) after World War II. At the time of its construction, Hon-Chiba Station was located close to present day Keisei Chiba-Chūō Station, but it was heavily damaged in World War II, and subsequently moved to its current location on 1 February 1958. In 1972 Emperor Hirohito used this station while on his way to inspect the Chiba Prefectural Cancer Center. The station became part of the JR East network upon the privatization of the Japan National Railways (JNR) on 1 April 1987.

Passenger statistics
In fiscal 2019, the station was used by an average of 11,901 passengers daily (boarding passengers only).

Surroundings
Hon-Chiba station is located in the heart of Chiba City. Rather than being located close to Chiba Station, Chiba prefectural office, Chiba District Court, and other government buildings can instead be found to the north of this station. Kenchō-mae Station on the Chiba Urban Monorail Line 1 is within a few minutes walking distance.

Also nearby:
 Kashiwado Hospital
 Chiba-Chūō Bus Headquarters
 Chiba Budōkan
 Samukawa Shrine
 Itsukushima Shrine
 Chiba University (Medicine & Nursing)
 Chiba Prefectural Chiba Senior High School and Chiba Junior High School
 Chiba Prefectural Library
 Chiba Municipal Samukawa Elementary School

See also
 List of railway stations in Japan

References

External links

 JR East station information 

Railway stations in Japan opened in 1896
Railway stations in Chiba Prefecture
Uchibō Line
Sotobō Line
Railway stations in Chiba (city)